Coon Valley Township is a township in Sac County, Iowa, USA.

The township's elevation is listed as 1207 feet above mean sea level.

History
Coon Valley Township was established in 1877. Its name comes from the fact that the Raccoon River flows through it.

Demographics 
As of 2010, Coon Valley Township had 187 residents and 92 housing units.

References

References

Townships in Sac County, Iowa
Townships in Iowa